National Route 361 is a national highway of Japan connecting Takayama, Gifu and Ina, Nagano in Japan, with a total length of .

See also

References

National highways in Japan
Roads in Gifu Prefecture
Roads in Nagano Prefecture